On 21 January 2017, in Uppsala, Sweden, a group of men gang raped a nearly unconscious woman for several hours and livestreamed it on Facebook. One of the men admitted to the crime during the video itself. Witnesses also stated that later in another video they made, the woman denied she was raped.

The incident was stopped when viewers of the Facebook Live feed realised what was happening and phoned the police, who entered the apartment and interrupted the crime as it was still in progress.

The Local, an English language news website, reported that "the alleged crime took place in an apartment in the city of Uppsala early on Sunday morning. The victim was reportedly close to unconscious." The BBC reports that "Josefine Lundgren, 21, called the police when she saw the video. Speaking to Swedish tabloid Expressen, she said she saw one of the men tear the woman's clothes off and lie on top of her. She also said one of the men had a gun." The Expressen online newspaper went on to say that "Police are investigating a case of suspected sexual abuse against a woman who was filmed and sent out live on Facebook on Sunday morning."

Two Afghan immigrants, one 18 and one 20 years old, were arrested, and a 24-year-old Swedish citizen was held for failing to report the crime; under Swedish law, their identities could not be released at the time.

The younger Afghan was sentenced to a year in prison for rape and the other was sentenced for 28 months. The accused Swedish citizen was jailed for 6 months on charges of not reporting rape and gross defamation. The judge stated that even if the woman had agreed to sex as they claimed, she was in a vulnerable position and hence they would be held guilty of rape. They were also told to pay 330,000 kronor to the victim as compensation.

See also
We Are Sthlm sexual assaults

References

Gang rape in Europe
Facebook criticisms and controversies
2017 crimes in Sweden
January 2017 crimes in Europe
Rape in Sweden
Violence against women in Sweden
Livestreamed crimes
2017 in Internet culture
Uppsala Municipality
January 2017 events in Europe